Events from the year 1960 in South Korea.

Incumbents
President: Rhee Syng-man (until 26 April), Yun Posun (starting 12 August)
Vice President: Chang Myon (until 23 April), Yun Posun (23 April-26 April)
Prime Minister: Heo Jeong (15 June-18 August)

Events
 26 January – According to National Police Agency of ROK official confirmed report, a human stampede by Lunar New Year rush in Seoul Station, total 31 persons were crush to death, 49 persons were hurt.
 2 March – According to South Korea Fire Service official confirmed report, a fire and explosion in Kukje Rubber and Manufacturing plant in Busan, 68 persons were fatalities.
 19 April - April Revolution
 5 September – Samyang Tires, as predecessor of Kumho Tires has founded.

Births

 3 June - Kim Hyun-jun, basketball player (died 1999)
 9 November - Seo Hajin, writer.
 20 December - Kim Ki-duk, film director (died 2020).

Deaths

 16 October - Hyun Jae-myung.

See also
List of South Korean films of 1960
Years in Japan
Years in North Korea

References

 
South Korea
Years of the 20th century in South Korea
South Korea
1960s in South Korea